The 1981–82 St. Louis Blues season was the 15th for the franchise in St. Louis, Missouri. The Blues finished the regular-season with a record of 32 wins, 40 losses and eight ties, good for 72 points, and qualified for the playoffs with their third-place finish. The Blues defeated the Jets, three games to one in the division semi-finals, before losing the Norris Division final to the Black Hawks in six games.

Offseason
Prior to the season, realignment took place in the NHL, as the Blues were assigned to the new-look James Norris Division in the Clarence Campbell Conference, along with the Chicago Black Hawks, Detroit Red Wings, Minnesota North Stars, Toronto Maple Leafs and the Winnipeg Jets.

Regular season

Final standings

Schedule and results

Playoffs

Player statistics

Regular season
Scoring

Goaltending

Playoffs
Scoring

Goaltending

Awards and records

Transactions

Draft picks
St. Louis's draft picks at the 1981 NHL Entry Draft held at the Montreal Forum in Montreal, Quebec.

Farm teams

See also
1981–82 NHL season

References

External links

St. Louis Blues seasons
St. Louis
St. Louis
St Louis
St Louis